J. H. Wallis (1885-1958) was a writer whose 1942 best-selling book Once Off Guard (later published as The Woman in the Window) was made into a film, The Woman in the Window (1944), directed by Fritz Lang.

Biography
James Harold Wallis was born in Iowa and educated at Yale. He was a newspaperman in Iowa, later writing full-time in New York.

Personal life 
Wallis' daughter, Jane O’Neil Wallis Burrell, was the first CIA employee to die on the job.

Works 
This list is incomplete.
 
 
 Murder by Formula (1931)
 The Capital City Mystery (1932)
 The Servant of Death (1932)
 Cries in the Night (1933)
 The Mystery of Vaucluse (1933)
 Murder Mansion (1934)
 
 The Niece of Abraham Pein (1943)

References

Further reading

External links
Review of Once Off Guard Includes a brief biography of Wallis.

American mystery writers
20th-century American poets
1885 births
1958 deaths
20th-century American novelists